Mickievič is a gender-neutral Belarusian-language surname. It is derived from the given name Mićko/Mićka, a diminutive of Dzmitryj.

Other forms:  Belarusian (Old Łacinka), Polish: Mickiewicz; Lithuanianized: Mickevičius, Belarusian, Russian: Mitskevich (transliteration from Cyrillic alphabet).

Notable people with the surname include:
 , Belarusian cultural worker, chemist. Son of Yakub Kolas
 Kanstancin Mickievič, birth name of Yakub Kolas
 , Belarusian chemist
 , Belarusian scientist, The younger son of Yakub Kolas
 , Belarusian Communist Party and state official

References

Belarusian-language surnames